The Daewoo Tacuma (or Rezzo) is a compact MPV that was produced by South Korean manufacturer Daewoo. Developed under the U100 code name, it was designed by Pininfarina and is based on the original Daewoo Nubira J100, a compact car.

Following the phasing out of Daewoo as a brand in most export markets, the car was rebadged as a Chevrolet, retaining either model name depending on the market. Additionally, the Chevrolet Vivant nameplate was introduced for the Singaporean, South African and South American markets.

Engines
The Tacuma comes with 1.6 L Family 1 or 2.0 L Family II straight-4 engines. 1.8 L engine was offered until 2005. It is available with a five-speed manual transmission or a four-speed automatic. Standard Tacuma have a seating capacity of five, but a seven-seater version was also introduced for the South Korean market. Maximum luggage capacity of the Tacuma is 1425 L.

In Korea, it is called Rezzo. It comes with 2.0 L Family II straight-4 engines and 2.0L E-TEC SOHC Liquefied petroleum gas.
(LPG) engines.  Most Rezzo's come fitted with an LPG powered engine because gasoline is very expensive in Korea.

Market
VIDAMCO of Vietnam once produced the Tacuma as the "Chevrolet Vivant" in complete knock-down kit (CKD). Production ceased in December 2011.

References

External links

Tacuma
Compact MPVs
Pininfarina
Cars introduced in 2000